Summer Hill is a small housing district in the Llansamlet ward, Swansea. The district is named after the hill itself.

Geography of Swansea